Sir Henry Albert Skinner (20 May 1926 – 15 March 1986) was a British barrister and High Court judge who sat in the Queen's Bench Division from 1980 until his death in 1986.

References 

 

Knights Bachelor
1986 deaths
Queen's Bench Division judges
Royal Naval Volunteer Reserve personnel of World War II
Members of Lincoln's Inn
Alumni of St John's College, Oxford
English King's Counsel
20th-century King's Counsel
1926 births